Move and I'll Shoot is a 1958 Italian comedy film directed by Mario Mattoli and starring Renato Rascel.

Cast
 Renato Rascel: Renato Tuzzi
 Giovanna Ralli: Giovanna
 Mario Carotenuto: Annibale
 Xenia Valderi: Sophelin Lolloe
 Franco Andrei: Scardocchia
 Dori Dorika: Augusta
 Cesare Bettarini

References

External links

1958 films
1950s Italian-language films
1958 comedy films
Films directed by Mario Mattoli
Italian comedy films
1950s Italian films